Biman (also Romanized as Bīman) is a village in Vahdatiyeh Rural District, Sadabad District, Dashtestan County, Bushehr Province, Iran. At the 2006 census, its population was 18, in 4 families.

References 

Populated places in Dashtestan County